The 1963–64 NBA season was the Lakers' 16th season in the NBA and fourth season in Los Angeles.

Roster

Regular season

Season standings 

x – clinched playoff spot

Record vs. opponents

Game log

Playoffs 

|- align="center" bgcolor="#ffcccc"
| 1
| March 21
| @ St. Louis
| L 104–115
| Jerry West (35)
| Elgin Baylor (15)
| Dick Barnett (5)
| Kiel Auditorium7,214
| 0–1
|- align="center" bgcolor="#ffcccc"
| 2
| March 22
| @ St. Louis
| L 90–106
| Elgin Baylor (20)
| LeRoy Ellis (8)
| Jim King (4)
| Kiel Auditorium7,014
| 0–2
|- align="center" bgcolor="#ccffcc"
| 3
| March 25
| St. Louis
| W 107–105
| Jerry West (39)
| Elgin Baylor (16)
| Elgin Baylor (11)
| Los Angeles Memorial Sports Arena11,728
| 1–2
|- align="center" bgcolor="#ccffcc"
| 4
| March 28
| St. Louis
| W 97–88
| Jerry West (39)
| LeRoy Ellis (11)
| Elgin Baylor (10)
| Los Angeles Memorial Sports Arena13,862
| 2–2
|- align="center" bgcolor="#ffcccc"
| 5
| March 30
| @ St. Louis
| L 108–121
| Elgin Baylor (28)
| Elgin Baylor (11)
| Dick Barnett (4)
| Kiel Auditorium9,574
| 2–3
|-

Awards and records 
 Elgin Baylor: All-NBA First Team, NBA All-Star Game
 Jerry West: All-NBA First Team, NBA All-Star Game

References 

Los Angeles Lakers seasons
Los Angeles
Los Angle
Los Angle